Song for Chico is an album by Arturo O'Farrill and the Afro-Latin Jazz Orchestra, released through Zoho Music in 2008. In 2009, the album won O'Farrill and the group the Grammy Award for Best Latin Jazz Album.

Track listing
 "Caravan" (Tizol) – 7:17
 "Such Love" (O'Farrill) – 8:15
 "Picadillo" (Puente) – 4:55
 "Song for Chico" (Prieto) – 8:23
 "Starry Nights" (Seeley) – 7:11
 "Cuban Blues" (O'Farrill) – 2:51
 "Humility" (Harrell) – 5:50
 "The Journey" (O'Farrill) – 4:58

References

2008 albums
Arturo O'Farrill albums
Grammy Award for Best Latin Jazz Album